Joseph Clarke (died 1749) was an English cleric and academic, known as a controversialist. He was particularly concerned to oppose followers of Samuel Clarke (no relation).

Life
The son of Joseph Clarke, D.D., rector of Long Ditton, Surrey, he was educated at Westminster School. He was then a student at Magdalene College, Cambridge, under Thomas Johnson. He was elected a fellow of his college, proceeded to the degree of M.A., and died after a long illness on 30 December 1749. His funeral sermon, preached in the parish church of Long Ditton on 4 January 1751, by the Rev. Richard Wooddeson, M.A., master of the school at Kingston-on-Thames, was printed at London, in 1751.

Works
His works are:

 Treatise of Space, 1733. 
 A Defence of the Athanasian Creed, as a preservative against Heresy. 
 A full and particular Reply to Mr. Chandler's Case of Subscription to Explanatory Articles of Faith, &c. 1749.

He also edited Daniel Waterland's Sermons on several important Subjects of Religion and Morality, 2 vols. Lond. 1742, 2nd ed. 1776.

References

Attribution

Year of birth missing
1749 deaths
18th-century English Anglican priests
Fellows of Magdalene College, Cambridge
People from Long Ditton